Takusa (Amharic: ታኩሳ) is a woreda in Amhara Region, Ethiopia. Part of the Semien Gondar Zone, Takusa is bordered on the south by Alefa, on the west by Qwara, on the northwest by the Metemma, on the north by Chilga, on the northeast by Dembiya, and on the east by Lake Tana. Towns in Takusa include Delgi. Takusa was part of Alefa woreda.

Demographics
Based on the 2007 national census conducted by the Central Statistical Agency of Ethiopia (CSA), this woreda has a total population of 129,097, of whom 65,782 are men and 63,315 women; 7,087 or 5.5% are urban inhabitants. The majority of the inhabitants practiced Ethiopian Orthodox Christianity, with 99% reporting that as their religion.

Notes

Districts of Amhara Region